The 1905 Baylor football team was an American football team that represented Baylor University as an independent during the 1905 college football season. In its first season under head coach Archie R. Webb, the team compiled a 1–6 record and was outscored by a total of 159 to 20.

Beginning in 1905, the team's home games were played at Carroll Field, between the Carroll Science Building and Waco Creek.

Schedule

Season summary

Nov. 30 vs. TCU
"The game [that] decided the local championship and was witnessed by the largest crowd ever seen on Carroll field" began with a first half that "was the most spectacular ever played on a local gridiron."  In that twenty-minute first half, each team's defense held the other's offense scoreless.  The game began with TCU receiving the kickoff and advanced from their 20-yard line to Baylor's 15 when the latter recovered a fumble.  Baylor's own drive advanced to TCU's 40-yard line, but likewise fumbled.  TCU's next possession brought them to the Baylor 2, but they couldn't convert and Baylor got a turnover on downs.  Baylor also could not convert and TCU got the ball forty yards back by a punt, but returned it to the Baylor 5 before fumbling again; Baylor again had to punt, as did TCU, and the half ended scoreless.  In the 30-minute second half, TCU scored three touchdowns and made the first and third tries, for seventeen points, while Baylor struggled on defense and offense.

References

Baylor
Baylor Bears football seasons
Baylor football